William J. Lewis (born August 5, 1941) is a former American football player and coach. He served as the head football coach at the University of Wyoming (1977–1979), East Carolina University (1989–1991), and the Georgia Institute of Technology (1992–1994), compiling a career college football record of 45–52–2. Lewis was a defensive assistant at many schools and most notably served as an assistant to Vince Dooley at the University of Georgia, helping win a National Championship in 1980.

Coaching career

Wyoming
Lewis was named the University of Wyoming's 22nd head football coach in December 1976 following the hiring of Fred Akers by the University of Texas at Austin to be the Longhorn's head coach. Lewis compiled a 13–21–1 (.386) win–loss record as Wyoming's coach through the 1977 to 1979 seasons. He was fired at the conclusion of the '79 season and replaced by Pat Dye. His largest margin of victory was 51–21 over the University of Texas at El Paso during the 1978 season. His worst loss as the Cowboy's head coach came against LSU the year before, 1977. The LSU Tigers pounced on Wyoming, 66–7, in Baton Rouge. He produced two noted NFL prospects, Ken Fantetti, a linebacker who went on to play for the Detroit Lions for seven years (1979–1985) and Guy Frazier another linebacker who played six years in the NFL for the Cincinnati Bengals (1981–1984) and the Buffalo Bills (1985–1986).

East Carolina
In his most successful head coaching position, Lewis lead the East Carolina Pirates to an 11–1 record and an amazing come from behind Peach Bowl victory over North Carolina State in 1991. The program had not had a winning season since 1983 before Lewis came there. Lewis served as head coach at East Carolina for three seasons (1989–1991) before departing for Georgia Tech. The 1991 Pirates finished the season with their highest national ranking, #9 in both the AP Poll and the Coaches' Poll, and Lewis received 1991 National Coach-of-the-Year honors from the American Football Coaches Association, United Press International, and Scripps-Howard.

Georgia Tech
Bill Lewis assumed the head coaching position at Georgia Tech in 1991 following Bobby Ross's departure to coach the NFL's San Diego Chargers. Lewis held the position from 1992 until midway through the 1994 season; he resigned (though some reports say he was effectively fired) after a 1–7 start and was replaced by defensive coordinator George O'Leary, who coached the final three games of the season, all losses.

Notre Dame
From 2005 to 2007, Lewis served as the assistant head coach and defensive backs coach for the Notre Dame Fighting Irish under Charlie Weis.

Head coaching record

References

External links
 Notre Dame profile

1941 births
Living people
American football quarterbacks
Arkansas Razorbacks football coaches
East Carolina Pirates football coaches
East Stroudsburg Warriors baseball players
East Stroudsburg Warriors football coaches
East Stroudsburg Warriors football players
Georgia Bulldogs football coaches
Georgia Tech Yellow Jackets football coaches
Miami Dolphins coaches
Notre Dame Fighting Irish football coaches
Pittsburgh Panthers football coaches
Wake Forest Demon Deacons football coaches
Wyoming Cowboys football coaches
People from Bucks County, Pennsylvania
Sportspeople from Philadelphia
Players of American football from Philadelphia